The Chivasso–Ivrea–Aosta railway is a railway line that links the regions of Piedmont and Aosta Valley in Italy. It was inaugurated from 1858 to 1886.
The railway was operated by the Italian Armys Ferrovieri Engineer Regiment from 1915 to 1943 and 1949 to 2001.

See also 
 List of railway lines in Italy

References

Footnotes

Sources

External links 

Railway lines in Piedmont
Railway lines opened in 1886